The Carl Bailey Company Building is a historic commercial building at 3100 East Broadway in North Little Rock, Arkansas.  Built about 1945, it is an International style structure modeled on the International Harvester "Servicenter" design of noted industrial designer Raymond Loewy, one of his few known building designs.  It has a low front section, originally housing offices and showrooms, and a taller rear section that was used as a service area.  A prominent brick pylon rises from the front of the building, which was originally adorned with the company name and International Harvester logo.

The building was listed on the National Register of Historic Places in 2009.

See also
National Register of Historic Places listings in Pulaski County, Arkansas

References

Commercial buildings on the National Register of Historic Places in Arkansas
Buildings and structures in North Little Rock, Arkansas
National Register of Historic Places in Pulaski County, Arkansas